"Cambia la Piel" (English: "Shed your skin") is a song by Puerto Rican singer Ricky Martin released as the only promotional single from his second English-language album, Sound Loaded (2000) in Spain and Latin America on October 15, 2001.

Background and release
"Cambia la Piel" is a Spanish-language song written by Pau Donés Cirera, leader of the Spanish rock group Jarabe de Palo. It was produced by Martin's collaborator, K. C. Porter. Thanks to "Cambia la Piel" (among few other tracks), Porter won the Latin Grammy Award for Producer of the Year at the Latin Grammy Awards of 2001. "Cambia la Piel" was released as the fourth (promotional only) single from Sound Loaded in Spain and Latin America on October 15, 2001.

Critical reception
Sal Cinquemani from Slant Magazine wrote that adding a Spanish-language original song "Cambia la Piel" to Sound Loaded was a good idea. He noted that Martin is better off singing in his native tongue, where his vocals seem more natural and less contrived. Jose F. Promis from AllMusic called it a sizzling track.

Formats and track listings
Spanish promotional CD single
"Cambia la Piel" – 5:13

Remix version
"Cambia la Piel" was remixed for the pLATINum Rhythm compilation, released by Madonna's Maverick company on October 30, 2001.

Cover versions
The song was covered in 2003 by Jarabe de Palo, whose lead singer wrote "Cambia la Piel" for Martin in 2000. It was included on band's fifth album, Bonito.

References

Ricky Martin songs
2001 singles
Spanish-language songs
2000 songs
Columbia Records singles